Richard B. Potts is a paleoanthropologist and has been the director of the Smithsonian Institution Museum of Natural History's Human Origins Program since 1985.  He is the curator of the David H. Koch Hall of Human Origins at the Smithsonian.

Life 
Potts graduated from Temple University in his home town of Philadelphia. In 1982 Potts received his doctorate in biological anthropology from Harvard University.  Prior to joining the Smithsonian Institution he taught at Yale University and was its Peabody Museum of Natural History curator of Physical Anthropology.
He has been involved with early human excavation sites in Africa and Asia.  His focus is on how human adaptation and evolution was in response to continuous changes in their environment over time.

Selected publications

See also 
 Dawn of Humanity (2015 PBS film)

References 

American paleoanthropologists
American curators
Smithsonian Institution people
Harvard University alumni
Human evolution theorists
Living people
Temple University alumni
Scientists from Philadelphia
Yale University faculty
20th-century American anthropologists
21st-century American anthropologists
Year of birth missing (living people)